Xenon oxide may refer to:

 Xenon dioxide, an unstable oxide also known as Xenon(IV) oxide
 Xenon trioxide, an unstable oxide
 Xenon tetroxide, an oxide stable below −35.9 °C